Mecistocephalus collinus is a species of centipede in the Mecistocephalidae family. It is endemic to Australia, and was first described in 1937 by German myriapodologist Karl Wilhelm Verhoeff.

Description
This species has 47 pairs of legs.

Distribution
The species occurs in south-west Western Australia. The type locality is Gooseberry Hill, Perth.

Behaviour
The centipedes are solitary terrestrial predators that inhabit plant litter and soil.

References

 

 
collinus
Centipedes of Australia
Endemic fauna of Australia
Fauna of Western Australia
Animals described in 1937
Taxa named by Karl Wilhelm Verhoeff